Distaeger is a genus of fossil prawns first described from the Luoping biota of the middle Triassic of China.  It includes one species, D. prodigiosus.

References

Dendrobranchiata
Prehistoric Malacostraca
Prehistoric crustacean genera
Triassic crustaceans
Prehistoric life of Asia